The Tunisian Women's Volleyball Cup is a women's volleyball competition in Tunisia held every year since its inception in 1959 and it is organized by The Tunisian Volleyball Federation. The competition winners use to be to compete in African Cup Winners but this African competition does not exist anymore when it end in 2006.

List of champions

Titles by club

Cup Final MVP players

See also 
 Tunisian Volleyball Cup

References

External links
Tunisian Volleyball Federation 

 

League
Volleyball competitions in Tunisia